Oliver St Clair may refer to:

Oliver St Clair, 12th Baron of Roslin
Sir Oliver St Clair de Pitcairnis